The 2017 VBA season was the second season of the Vietnam Basketball Association. The regular season began on September 5, 2017 and end on November 5, 2017. The playoffs began on November 8, 2017 and ended on December 3, 2017, with the Thang Long Warriors beating the Cantho Catfish in 5 games to clinch their first VBA title.

Teams

Venues and locations

Personnel and sponsorship

Managerial changes

Draft
The Thang Long Warriors selected Justin Young first in the inaugural VBA Heritage Player Draft.

Import players
Each team is allowed 2 heritage players and 1 foreign player.

Regular season

Standings

Playoffs

Statistics

Team statistic leaders

Awards

Yearly awards
Season MVP: Jaywuan Hill (Thang Long Warriors)
Season Local MVP: Tô Quang Trung (Thang Long Warriors)
Season Heritage MVP: Tam Dinh (Cantho Catfish)
Defensive Player of the Year: DeAngelo Hamilton (Cantho Catfish)
Youth Man of the Year: Nguyễn Hoàng Tuấn (Danang Dragons)
Sixth Man of the Year: Nguyễn Huỳnh Hải (Saigon Heat)
Coach of the Year: Kevin Yurkus (Cantho Catfish)

MVP of the Week

Notable occurrences
The VBA held their annual tryouts for players of Vietnamese heritage at Hope International University in Fullerton, CA on May 6–7, 2017.
The Thang Long Warriors became the league's 6th franchise.
On May 19, the Saigon Heat and head coach Anthony Garbelotto mutually agreed to terminate his contract after a disappointing season with the ASEAN Basketball League team.
On June 14, the inaugural VBA Draft was held in HCMC for unsigned heritage players from the 2016 season and selects from the US tryouts.
The first ever trade in league history happened on June 28 with the Hochiminh City Wings trading the draft rights for Jimmy Kien to the Saigon Heat for the draft rights for Anthony Vo.

Notes

References

External links
 Official website

Vietnam Basketball Association seasons
2017–18 in Vietnamese basketball
2017–18 in Asian basketball leagues